The 2013–14 FA Vase was the 40th season of the FA Vase, an annual football competition for teams in the lower reaches of the English football league system.

Sholing won the competition, beating West Auckland Town in the final.

Semi-finals

Sholing won 6–4 on aggregate.

Final

References

FA Vase
FA Vase
FA Vase seasons